The Cambrian Salvor was a salvage and rescue tug that served during World War II with the Royal Australian Navy, however was never commissioned. She was sold in 1958 to Island Tug & Barge Ltd, Vancouver, before being sold in 1962 and renamed Caribische Zee, successively sold and or renamed Collinsea in 1963, Francois C in 1971 and Ras Deira in 1981.

Fate
She was scrapped in 1981.

Citations

References
 

1942 ships
Ships built in Napa, California
Tugboats of the Royal Australian Navy
Tugboats of Canada